This article lists the various treatments given by Franz Liszt to the works of almost 100 other composers.

These treatments included transcriptions for other instruments (predominantly solo piano), arrangements, orchestrations, fantaisies, reminiscences, paraphrases, illustrations, variations, and editions.

Liszt also extensively treated his own works in a similar manner, but these are not tallied here—neither are his treatments of national (or "folk") melodies whose composers are unknown, nor other anonymous works.

In most cases, Liszt arranged only one or two pieces by a composer, but he delved more deeply into the works of Bach, Beethoven, Berlioz, Donizetti, Mendelssohn, Meyerbeer, Mozart, Rossini, Schubert, Verdi, Wagner, and Weber.

The earliest-born composer whose works Liszt dealt with was Orlande de Lassus (born ). Jacques Arcadelt was born earlier, but Liszt's treatment was not of Arcadelt's original work, rather of a setting by Pierre-Louis Dietsch loosely based on Arcadelt. The last composer to die whose works Liszt dealt with was Géza Zichy (1849–1924).

Kornél Ábrányi

Gregorio Allegri

Alexander Alyabyev

Note: The Mazurka pour piano composée par un amateur de St. Pétersbourg, paraphrasée par F. L. (S.384) was based on a mazurka that has often been misattributed to Alyabyev, but was in fact written by Mikhail Vielgorsky.

Jacques Arcadelt

Thomas Arne

Daniel Auber

Johann Sebastian Bach

Giuseppe Baini

Ludwig van Beethoven

Vincenzo Bellini

Hector Berlioz

Louise Bertin

János Bihari

Giovanni Bononcini

Alexander Borodin

René de Galard de Béarn, Marquis de Brassac

Pyotr Bulakhov

Hans von Bülow

Frédéric Chopin

August Conradi

Peter Cornelius

Guillaume Louis Cottrau

César Cui

Alexander Dargomyzhsky

Ferdinand David

Léo Delibes

Josef Dessauer

Anton Diabelli

Pierre-Louis Dietsch

Gaetano Donizetti

Giuseppe Donizetti

Felix Draeseke

Béni Egressy and Ferenc Erkel

Ferenc Erkel

Ernest II, Duke of Saxe-Coburg and Gotha

László Fáy

Leó Festetics

John Field

Robert Franz

Wenzel Robert von Gallenberg

Manuel García

Ludmilla Gizycka-Zámoyská

Mikhail Glinka

Adalbert von Goldschmidt

Charles Gounod

Fromental Halévy

George Frideric Handel

Johann von Herbeck



Johann Nepomuk Hummel

Ernest Knop

Francis Korbay

Josef Krov

Charles Philippe Lafont

Eduard Lassen

Orlande de Lassus



Prince Louis Ferdinand of Prussia

Sir Alexander Mackenzie

Grand Duchess Maria Pavlovna of Russia

Jules Massenet

Felix Mendelssohn

Saverio Mercadante

Giacomo Meyerbeer

Mihály Mosonyi

Wolfgang Amadeus Mozart

Otto Nicolai

Giovanni Pacini

Niccolò Paganini

Luigi Pantaleoni

Giovanni Battista Perucchini

F. Pezzini

Joachim Raff

Alexander Ritter

Salvator Rosa (attrib.)

Gioachino Rossini
{| class="wikitable"
! Original work
! Liszt work
! Forces
! Date
! S no.
! Notes
|-
| Opera Otello (1816):
 Gondolier's song "Nessun maggior dolore" (Act III)
| Années de pèlerinage, Deuxième Année: Italie. Supplement: Venezia e Napoli
 No. 2, Canzone
| rowspan=9 style="text-align: center" | piano
| style="text-align: center" | 1859
| S.162/2
|-
| Operas Armida (1817) and La donna del lago (1819)
| Impromptu brilliant sur des thèmes de Rossini et Spontini
| rowspan=2 style="text-align: center" | 1824
| S.150
| Also includes themes from operas by Gaspare Spontini
|-
| Opera Ermione
| Sept variations brillantes sur un thème de G. Rossini
| S.149
|
|-
| Opera Mosè in Egitto (1818)
| Fantaisie sur des thèmes de 'Maometto' et 'Mose| style="text-align: center" | ?
| S.751
| Lost
|-
| Opera Le siège de Corinthe (1826)
| Introduction des variations sur une marche du Siège de Corinthe
| style="text-align: center" | 1830
| S.750; renumbered as 421a
| Lost Only the Introduction survives; there is no trace of the Variations on a March from Le Siège de Corinthe
|-
| Opera William Tell (1829)
 William Tell Overture
| Transcription
| style="text-align: center" | 1838
| S.552
|-
| rowspan=3 | Les Soirées musicales, 8 ariettas and 4 duets (1835)
| La Serenata e l'Orgia.  Grande Fantaisie sur des motifs des Soirées musicales
| rowspan=2 style="text-align: center" |  1835‑36
| S.422
| Nos. 10 and 11; also includes a theme from La promessa (No. 1)
|-
| La pastorella dell'Alpi e Li marinari.  2me Fantaisie sur des motifs des Soirées musicales
| S.423
| Nos. 6 and 12; also includes a theme from La regata veneziana (No. 2)
|-
| Soirées musicales
| style="text-align: center" | 1837
| S.424
| The 12 numbers are: 1. La promessa; 2. La regata veneziana; 3. L'invito; 4. La gita in gondola; 5. Il rimprovero; 6. La pastorella dell'Alpi; 7. La partenza; 8. La pesca; 9. La danza; 10. La serenata; 11. L'orgia; 12. Li marinari
|-
| rowspan=3 | Stabat Mater (1841): 
 No. 2, "Cujus animam"
| rowspan=2 | Transcription
| style="text-align: center" | organ/trombone
| style="text-align: center" | 1860s
| S.679
| rowspan=2|  Also used in S.553
|-
| style="text-align: center" | tenor/organ
| style="text-align: center" | pub. 1874
| S.682
|-
| rowspan=2 | Deux Transcriptions d'après Rossini:
 No. 1, "Cujus animam"
 No. 2, "La Charité"
| rowspan=2 style="text-align: center" | piano
| rowspan=2 style="text-align: center" | 1847
| rowspan=2 | S.553
|-
| 3 Choeurs religieux, female chorus and piano (1844): 
 No. 3, "La Charité"
|
|-
|}

Claude Joseph Rouget de Lisle

Jean-Jacques Rousseau

Anton Rubinstein

Camille Saint-Saëns

Franz Schubert

Clara Schumann

Robert Schumann
{| class="wikitable"
! Original work
! Liszt work
! Forces
! Date
! S no.
! Notes
|-
| Myrthen, Op. 25 (1840):
 No. 1, "Widmung"
| "Liebeslied"
| rowspan=7 style="text-align: center" | piano
| 1848
| S.566
|
|-
| Lieder und Gesänge, Vol. I, Op. 27 (1840):
 No. 2, "Dem roten Röslein gleicht mein Lieb"
| "Rotes Röslein", No. 2 of 2 Lieder von Robert Schumann
| 1861
| S.567/2
|
|-
| 6 Gedichte, Op. 36 (1840):
 No. 4, "An den Sonnenschein"
| No. 1 of 2 Lieder von Robert Schumann
| 1861
| S.567/1
|
|-
| Liederkreis, Op. 39 (1840):
 No. 12, "Frühlingsnacht"
| Transcription
| 1872
| S.568
|
|-
| Liederalbum für die Jugend, 28 songs, Op. 79 (1849):
 No. 16, "Weihnachtslied"
 No. 17, "Die wandelnde Glocke"
 No. 19, "Frühlings Ankunft"
 No. 22, "Des Sennen Abschied"
 No. 23, "Er ist's"
| rowspan=2 | Lieder von Robert und Clara Schumann: Book A (Robert)
| rowspan=2 | 1874
| rowspan=2 | S.569/1–7
| rowspan=2 | Nos. 1–5 were from Op. 79, and Nos. 6–7 were from Op. 98a.  The set of 10 transcriptions also includes 3 songs by Clara Schumann.
|-
| ''Lieder und Gesänge aus 'Wilhelm Meister, 9 songs, Op. 98a (1849):
 No. 3, "Nur wer die Sehnsucht kennt"
 No. 5, "An die Türen will ich schleichen"
|-
| Des Sängers Fluch, 14 songs, Op. 139 (1852):
 No. 4, "Provenzalisches Minnelied"
| Transcription
| 1881
| S.570
|
|-
|}

Bedřich Smetana

Louis Spohr

Gaspare Spontini

Imre Széchényi

Karl Tausig

Pyotr Ilyich Tchaikovsky

Pier Adolfo Tirindelli

Giuseppe Verdi

Mikhail Vielgorsky

Note: Vielgorski is also seen as Count Michael Wielhorski.

Richard Wagner

Carl Maria von Weber

Juliusz Zarębski

Géza Zichy

Index of S. numbers

 S.54: Giuseppe Baini
 S.116: Ernest II, Duke of Saxe-Coburg and Gotha
 S.120: Hector Berlioz
 S.122: Ludwig van Beethoven
 S.126b/2: Wenzel Robert von Gallenberg
 S.127: Frédéric Chopin
 S.128: Charles Philippe Lafont
 S.140, 141: Niccolò Paganini
 S.147: Anton Diabelli
 S.149: Gioachino Rossini
 S.150: Gioachino Rossini, Gaspare Spontini
 S.155/3: Franz Schubert
 S.156/10: Ferdinand Huber
 S.156/11: Ernest Knop
 S. 156/12, 156a/1: Ferdinand Huber
 S.156a/3: Ernest Knop
 S.159: Guillaume-Louis Cottrau
 S.161/3: Giovanni Bononcini (misattrib. Salvator Rosa)
 S.162: Guillaume-Louis Cottrau
 S.162/2: Gioachino Rossini
 S.168: Prince Louis Ferdinand of Prussia
 S.172/4: Grand Duchess Maria Pavlovna of Russia
 S.179, 180: Johann Sebastian Bach
 S.181: George Frideric Handel
 S.183: Jacques Arcadelt, Pierre-Louis Dietsch
 S.205, 206: Mihály Mosonyi
 S.207a: Alexander Borodin
 S.208a/2: Wenzel Robert von Gallenberg
 S.234: Josef Krov
 S.236/2: René de Galard de Béarn, Marquis de Brassac
 S.237: Claude Joseph Rouget de Lisle
 S.241/1: László Fáy
 S.241/2: János Bihari
 S.244/19: Kornél Ábrányi
 S.245: Kornél Ábrányi
 S.246: Ludmilla Gizycka-Zámoyská
 S.249/2: Frédéric Chopin
 S.250/1: Alexander Alyabyev
 S.250/2: Pyotr Bulakhov
 S.252: Manuel García
 S.256: Alexander Borodin
 S.257: Felix Mendelssohn
 S.259: Giacomo Meyerbeer
 S.351: Hans von Bülow
 S.352: Peter Cornelius
 S.353: Béni Egressy, Ferenc Erkel
 S.360: Gregorio Allegri, Wolfgang Amadeus Mozart
 S.363: Franz Schubert
 S.364: Juliusz Zarębski
 S.367, 367a: Carl Maria von Weber
 S.368: Francis Korbay
 S.375, 376: Franz Schubert
 S.377: Géza Zichy
 S.379b: Ludmilla Gizycka-Zámoyská
 S.380: Richard Wagner
 S.383a: Kornél Ábrányi
 S.384: Alexander Alyabyev (misattrib.), Mikhail Vielgorsky
 S.385, 385a, 386, 387: Daniel Auber
 S.388, 389: Ludwig van Beethoven
 S.390–394: Vincenzo Bellini
 S.395, 396: Hector Berlioz
 S.397–400, 400a, 401, 402: Gaetano Donizetti
 S.403: Giuseppe Donizetti
 S.404: Ernest II, Duke of Saxe-Coburg and Gotha
 S.405: Ferenc Erkel
 S.405a: Leó Festetics
 S.406: Mikhail Glinka
 S.407, 408, 409: Charles Gounod
 S.409a: Fromental Halévy
 S.410: Felix Mendelssohn
 S.411: Saverio Mercadante
 S.412–416: Giacomo Meyerbeer
 S.417: Mihály Mosonyi
 S.418: Wolfgang Amadeus Mozart
 S.419: Giovanni Pacini
 S.420: Niccolò Paganini
 S.421: Joachim Raff
 S.422–424: Gioachino Rossini
 S.425–427: Franz Schubert
 S.428: Mariano Soriano
 S.429: Pyotr Ilyich Tchaikovsky
 S.430: János Végh
 S.431, 431a, 432–438: Giuseppe Verdi
 S.439–450: Richard Wagner
 S.451–455: Carl Maria von Weber
 S.456: Géza Zichy
 S.458: Saverio Mercadante
 S.461: Gregorio Allegri, Wolfgang Amadeus Mozart
 S.462, 463: Johann Sebastian Bach
 S.464–469: Ludwig van Beethoven
 S.470–475: Hector Berlioz
 S.476, 477, 477a: Louise Bertin
 S.478: Pyotr Bulakhov
 S.479: Hans von Bülow
 S.480: Frédéric Chopin
 S.481: August Conradi
 S.482: César Cui
 S.483: Alexander Dargomyzhsky
 S.483bis: Ferdinand David
 S.484, 484/19bis: Ferdinand David
 S.485: Josef Dessauer
 S.485a: Felix Draeseke
 S.485b: Ernest II, Duke of Saxe-Coburg and Gotha
 S.486: Béni Egressy, Ferenc Erkel
 S.487: Leó Festetics
 S.488, 489: Robert Franz
 S.490: Adalbert von Goldschmidt
 S.491: Charles Gounod
 S.492: Johann von Herbeck
 S.493: Johann Nepomuk Hummel
 S.494–497: Eduard Lassen
 S.498: Otto Lessmann
 S.506b: Giuseppe Baini
 S.522: Ernest II, Duke of Saxe-Coburg and Gotha
 S.547, 548: Felix Mendelssohn
 S.549: Giacomo Meyerbeer
 S.550: Wolfgang Amadeus Mozart
 S.551: F. Pezzini
 S.551a: Joachim Raff
 S,552, 553: Gioachino Rossini
 S.554, 554a: Anton Rubinstein
 S.555: Camille Saint-Saëns
 S.557–562: Franz Schubert
 S.563: Franz Schubert, August Heinrich von Weyrauch
 S.564, 565: Franz Schubert
 S.566–568, 569/1–7: Robert Schumann
 S.569/8–10: Clara Schumann
 S.570: Robert Schumann
 S.570a: Bedřich Smetana
 S.571: Louis Spohr
 S.571a: Johann Strauss II, Karl Tausig
 S.572: Jules Massenet, Imre Széchényi
 S.574–576, 576a: Carl Maria von Weber
 S.577: Mikhail Vielgorsky
 S.577a: John Field
 S.607: Ernest II, Duke of Saxe-Coburg and Gotha
 S.620: Josef Krov
 S.623a: Kornél Ábrányi
 S.624: Giacomo Meyerbeer
 S.627: Vincenzo Bellini
 S.628: Hector Berlioz
 S.628a: Béni Egressy, Ferenc Erkel
 S.629: Mikhail Glinka
 S.630: Giacomo Meyerbeer
 S.631: Joachim Raff
 S.632: Franz Schubert
 S.633: Gregorio Allegri, Wolfgang Amadeus Mozart
 S.634: Ludwig van Beethoven
 S.634a: Wolfgang Amadeus Mozart
 S.649: Ludwig van Beethoven
 S.654, 655: Vincenzo Bellini
 S.656: Wolfgang Amadeus Mozart
 S.657a: Ludwig van Beethoven
 S.658: Gregorio Allegri, Wolfgang Amadeus Mozart
 S.659: Jacques Arcadelt, Pierre-Louis Dietsch
 S.660, 661: Johann Sebastian Bach
 S.662: Frédéric Chopin
 S.663: Orlande de Lassus
 S.669c: Giuseppe Baini
 S.673: Johann Sebastian Bach
 S.675: Otto Nicolai
 S.675a: Alexander Ritter
 S.675c: Giuseppe Verdi
 S.676: Richard Wagner
 S.679: Gioachino Rossini
 S.682: Gioachino Rossini
 S.683a: Francis Korbay
 S.684: Luigi Pantaleoni
 S.685: Grand Duchess Maria Pavlovna of Russia
 S.686: Felix Draeseke
 S.694: Thomas Arne
 S.697: Wolfgang Amadeus Mozart
 S.698: Léo Delibes
 S.700, 700a: Niccolò Paganini
 S.700h: Charles Philippe Lafont
 S.739, 740: Ludwig van Beethoven
 S.741: Hector Berlioz
 S.742: Gaetano Donizetti
 S.743: Charles Gounod
 S.743a: Fromental Halévy
 S.744: Gaetano Donizetti
 S.748: Wolfgang Amadeus Mozart
 S.750, 751: Gioachino Rossini
 S.752: Anton Rubinstein
 S.753: Franz Schubert
 S.754: Pier Adolfo Tirindelli
 S.755a: Thomas Arne
 S.761: Frédéric Chopin

References

Sources
 Grove's Dictionary of Music and Musicians'', 5th ed, 1954, Vol. V, pp. 264–316, Franz Liszt: Catalogue of Works

 
Liszt
 Z
Liszt